Telipna sanguinea, the sanguine telipna, is a butterfly in the family Lycaenidae. It is found in Nigeria, Cameroon, the Republic of the Congo, Equatorial Guinea, Gabon, Angola, the Central African Republic, the Democratic Republic of the Congo, Uganda and Tanzania. The habitat consists of forests.

Adults are similar to day-flying moths of the genus Aletis. They are on wing during the rainy season.

The larvae feed on lichens growing on the bark of tree trunks.

Subspecies
Telipna sanguinea sanguinea (eastern Nigeria, Cameroon, northern Congo, Equatorial Guinea, Gabon, Angola, Central African Republic, Democratic Republic of the Congo)
Telipna sanguinea depuncta Talbot, 1937 (Uganda, north-western Tanzania)

References

Butterflies described in 1880
Poritiinae
Butterflies of Africa